Riverstone High School, is a co-educational, comprehensive high school located on the northwest fringes of Sydney, New South Wales, Australia.  	

Riverstone High School was established in January 1962 at 71 McCulloch Street, Riverstone. The school has been recognised in the past for academic achievement and produced some outstanding students. The school is well known for its sporting success, particularly in football, hockey, netball, swimming, and athletics. The school also has a strong focus on literacy, technology, and talented students.

In 1999, the school joined the Nirimba Collegiate, which also includes nearby Quakers Hill High School, Seven Hills High School, and Wyndham College. Riverstone operates from Year 7 through 10. Senior schooling, Years 11-12 are completed at Wyndham College. Consideration is currently under way to once again offer Years 11 and 12 at Riverstone from 2020 onwards. In 1979–80, 970 students attended the school from year 7 to 12.

The school emblem is an oval with a navy surround. The centre is light blue with a red kangaroo. The school's motto, "PRIDE", is printed on a red boomerang. For many years students proudly wore the school badge. The school's mission is "to provide a positive and stimulating environment which values and fosters: the involvement of parents and care-givers in students' education; teaching and learning that is enjoyable, challenging, rewarding and lifelong; mutual respect, responsibility and individuality; striving by staff and students to achieve potential; self esteem and self confidence through participation in academic, cultural, sporting, and social pursuits; and an appreciation of our physical environment."

The school auditorium was constructed in the early 1970s and opened in 1975. It was named the Jack Lang Auditorium in honour of the Labour politician John Thomas 'Jack' Lang, who lived at nearby Schofields for the last years of his life.

The school has a Support Unit catering for students with mild to moderate intellectual disabilities and complex needs. The full range of students' abilities are catered for with a wide variety of programs including extension and remediation programs.

It is often referred to as "Rivo" by students and local community.

As of 2019 the school began extensive renovations, demolishing one of the three main blocks and replacing it with a more up to date facility, said facility as of late 2020 is in use by the faculty and students.

References 

Public high schools in Sydney
1962 establishments in Australia
Educational institutions established in 1962